Thepfülo-u Nakhro (T. N.) Angami (1913 – 1986) was an Indian politician from Nagaland who served as the first Speaker of the Nagaland Legislative Assembly and the second Chief Minister of the North East Indian state of Nagaland.

Early life 
T.N. Angami was born the son of V N Angami in Jotsoma village near Kohima in a wealthy Angami Naga family in 1913. He was schooled in Kohima, Jorhat and Shillong. He served as a Store Keeper in the Indian Army during the Second World War. From 1946, he worked in the office of the Deputy Commissioner of the Naga Hills District for five years.

Political career 
Angami began his political life in 1951 when he resigned from his job as an office assistant to join the Naga National Council, an organisation that he went on to head as its president. Later, as the Council under Angami Zapu Phizo took to armed rebellion against the Government of India, Angami opposed Phizo and, in 1957, formed the Reforming Committee of the Naga National Council with the aims of opposing violence, winning over the rebels and restoring peace in Nagaland. In August 1957, the Reforming Committee convened an All Tribes Conference in Kohima that called for the constitution of the Naga Hills District and the Tuensang Division of the North East Frontier Agency into a single administrative division within the Union of India.

The state of Nagaland was established in 1963 and P. Shilu Ao of the Naga Nationalist Organisation became its first Chief Minister. Following elections to the Nagaland Legislative Assembly in 1964, Angami was elected its first Speaker. Following a no confidence motion against the government, Ao resigned as Chief Minister and was succeeded by Angami who served from August, 1966 to February, 1969. As Chief Minister, he convened a Peace Mission and convinced the Government of India to take a more liberal view of the rebels and to grant them amnesty without preconditions. His efforts resulted in a ceasefire agreement between the Government of India and the Naga rebels. In 1968, Angami made several demands to constitute a boundary commission to settle the border dispute between Nagaland and Assam. He also insisted that his government would not be a party to the creation of the North Eastern Council as the central government decided on it without consultation with Nagaland. In the elections of 1969, the Naga Nationalist Organisation was voted back to power but Angami stepped down as Chief Minister and was succeeded by Hokishe Sema. Later, Angami shifted to the United Democratic Front and then joined the Congress(I).

References 

Chief Ministers of Nagaland
Speakers of the Nagaland Legislative Assembly
Indian National Congress politicians from Nagaland
Naga people
People from Kohima
People from Kohima district
Indian Army personnel of World War II
Nagaland MLAs 1964–1969